Leon Henry Ferguson (19 June 1923 – 31 July 1989) was an Australian water polo player who competed in the 1948 Summer Olympics along with his brother Jack Ferguson.

References

External links
 
 

1923 births
1989 deaths
Australian male water polo players
Olympic water polo players of Australia
Water polo players at the 1948 Summer Olympics
Water polo players from Sydney
Sportsmen from New South Wales